Jerzy Patoła (April 19, 1946 - July 1, 2016) was a Polish footballer who played in the Ekstraklasa, and the National Soccer League.

Career 
Patoła began his football career in 1964 with Zagłębie Sosnowiec of the Ekstraklasa where he played for 13 seasons. During his tenure with Sosnowiec his achievements were reaching the Polish Cup finals in 1970/1971, finishing runners up three times, and featuring in several Intertoto Cup tournaments. He made his debut for the club on May 24, 1964 in a match against Ruch Chorzów, and made his final appearance on November 30, 1975 against Lech Poznań. In 1976, he went overseas to Canada to sign with Toronto Falcons of the National Soccer League. He played with the club until the 1981 season.

International career 
He played with the Poland Olympic football team in a match against Sweden on May 19, 1966. He eventually retired from competitive soccer and settled in Canada as machinist. He died on July 1, 2016 in Mississauga, Ontario.

References 

1946 births
2016 deaths
Polish footballers
Polish expatriate footballers
Zagłębie Sosnowiec players
Toronto Falcons players
Ekstraklasa players
Canadian National Soccer League players
People from Sosnowiec
Association football goalkeepers
Expatriate soccer players in Canada
Polish expatriate sportspeople in Canada